The Treur River (from Afrikaans: mourning river) is a small river in the Drakensberg escarpment region of eastern Mpumalanga province, South Africa. The R532 motor route intersects it twice. Its ultimate origin is inside the Blyde River Canyon Nature Reserve, though most of its course is to the west of this protected area. It is a tributary of the Blyde River, and has no major tributaries of its own. There are two sharp drops in its course, at Poe Falls  and Bourke's Luck Potholes respectively.

Etymology
Treur means "mourning" in Dutch, and was thus named during a voortrekker expedition. In 1844, while still under the misapprehension that Hendrik Potgieter and his party had perished on their journey to Delagoa Bay, their distraught relatives named the river near their encampment, Treurrivier, or 'mourning river'.

Treur River Barb 

The Treur river is home to the Treur River Barb, a species of  cyprinid fish that is endemic to Northern Mpumalanga. It was thought to be pushed to extinction by the introduction of exotic fish but it was rediscovered in the Bylde River in 1985. The Treur River Barb was subsequently reintroduced to the Treur River.

See also
 Treur River Barb

References

Rivers of Mpumalanga